Klyuchevoy is a rural locality (a village) in Abdullinsky Selsoviet, Mechetlinsky District, Bashkortostan, Russia. The population was 180 in 2010. There are four streets.

Geography 
Klyuchevoy is located 23 km northwest of Bolsheustyikinskoye (the district's administrative centre) by road. Abdullino is the nearest rural locality.

References 

Rural localities in Mechetlinsky District